Baklushi is a rural locality (a selo) in Bolshesosnovskoye Rural Settlement, Bolshesosnovsky District, Perm Krai, Russia. The population was 363 as of 2010. There are 4 streets.

Geography 
Baklushi is located 10 km southwest of Bolshaya Sosnova, the district's administrative centre, by road. Bolshaya Sosnova is the nearest rural locality.

References 

Rural localities in Bolshesosnovsky District